Box No. 88 is a 2019 Burmese drama film starring Nay Toe, Eaindra Kyaw Zin and Htun Htun. The film, produced by 7th Sense Film Production premiered in Myanmar on November 7, 2019.

Cast
 Nay Toe as Ye Htet
 Eaindra Kyaw Zin as Waddi Nwe (his wife)
 Hnin Thway Yu Aung (child actress) as daughter of Ye Htet (his daughter)
 Htun Htun as That Ti
 Kaew Korravee as lady#
 Thar Nyi as police chief

References

2019 films
2010s Burmese-language films
Burmese drama films
Films shot in Myanmar